Skjöldr (Latinized as Skioldus, sometimes Anglicized as Skjold or Skiold) was among the first legendary Danish kings. He is mentioned in the Prose Edda, in Ynglinga saga, in Chronicon Lethrense, in Sven Aggesen's history, in Arngrímur Jónsson's Latin abstract of the lost Skjöldunga saga and in Saxo Grammaticus' Gesta Danorum. Under the name Scyld he also appears in the Old English poem Beowulf. The various accounts have little in common.

In the Skjöldunga saga and the Ynglinga saga, Odin came from Asia (Scythia) and conquered Northern Europe. He gave Sweden to his son Yngvi and Denmark to his son Skjöldr. Since then the kings of Sweden were called Ynglings and those of Denmark Skjöldungs.

Scyld Scefing is the legendary ancestor of the Danish royal lineage known as the Scyldings. He is the counterpart of the Skioldus or Skjöldr of Danish and Icelandic sources.

He appears in the opening lines of Beowulf, where he is referred to as Scyld Scefing, implying he is a descendant of Sceafa, Scyld son of Scef, or Scyld of the Sheaf. The Beowulf poet places him in a boat which is seen in other stories about Scef as a child in a boat: 
Scyld the Sheaf-Child from scourging foemen,
From raiders a-many their mead-halls wrested.
He lives to be feared, the first has a waif,
Puny and frail he was found on the shore.
He grew to be great, and was girt with power
Till the border-tribes all obeyed his rule,
And sea-folk hardy that sit by the whale-path
Gave him tribute, a good king was he.

After relating in general terms the glories of Scyld's reign, the poet describes Scyld's funeral, his body was laid in a ship surrounded by treasures:
They decked his body no less bountifully
with offerings than those first ones did
who cast him away when he was a child
and launched him alone out over the waves.

In Beowulf 33, Scyld's ship is called īsig, literally, "icy." The meaning of this epithet has been discussed many times. Anatoly Liberman gives a full survey of the literature and suggests that the word meant "shining."

William of Malmesbury's 12th century Chronicle tells the story of Sceafa as a sleeping child in a boat without oars with a sheaf of corn at his head.

Olrik (1910) suggested Peko, a parallel "barley-figure" in Finnish, in turn connected by Fulk (1989) with Eddaic Bergelmir.

References

 
 
 

Mythological kings of Denmark
Scyldings
Sons of Odin
Legendary progenitors